Brad Patton (born 9 November 1979) is a New Zealand cricketer. He played in twenty-five first-class and seven List A matches for Central Districts from 2007 to 2011.

See also
 List of Central Districts representative cricketers

References

External links
 

1979 births
Living people
New Zealand cricketers
Central Districts cricketers
Cricketers from Hastings, New Zealand